Irréversible is a 2002 French experimental psychological thriller film written and directed by Gaspar Noé. Starring Monica Bellucci, Vincent Cassel, and Albert Dupontel, the plot depicts the events of a tragic night in Paris as two men attempt to avenge the brutal rape and beating of the woman they love. The film is made up of a title sequence followed by 13 segments made to look like long takes. Each of these segments is either a continuous shot or a series of shots digitally composited to resemble a continuous shot. The story is told in reverse order, with each scene taking place chronologically before the one that precedes it.

Theatrically released in France, the United Kingdom and the United States, Irréversible competed for the Palme d'Or at the 2002 Cannes Film Festival and won the Bronze Horse at the Stockholm International Film Festival. Critical reception was mixed, with praise towards the performances and Noé's direction, but criticism towards its graphic portrayal of violence and rape. American film critic Roger Ebert called Irréversible "a movie so violent and cruel that most people will find it unwatchable".

Plot
During a night in Paris, emergency personnel respond to an altercation at the Rectum, a gay BDSM club. Two men are taken outside the club: Marcus, who's being carried out on a stretcher; and Pierre, who's being arrested by the police.

The next scene shows a volatile Marcus and reluctant Pierre enter the Rectum in search of a suspected rapist known as Le Tenia. Marcus then proceeds to get into a fight with a man he suspects of being Le Tenia, who ends up breaking his arm before attempting to rape him. Pierre comes to his rescue and beats the man to death with a nearby fire extinguisher as the man's companion watches in amusement.

As the film progresses, it's revealed that the two men were attempting to avenge the rape and near-fatal beating of Alex, Marcus' girlfriend and Pierre's ex. Viewers discover that Alex had left a house party attended by the two men due to Marcus' boorish behavior and walked home alone through a pedestrian underpass when she notices a transgender prostitute getting attacked by Le Tenia, who turns out to be the companion of the man killed at the Rectum. Upon realizing he's been seen, Le Tenia immediately turns his attention to Alex, anally raping her before savagely beating her into unconsciousness. After Marcus and Pierre discover Alex being taken away by paramedics, they encounter street criminals Mourad and Layde, who offer to help them find the culprit. The group tracks down Concha, the prostitute from before, through an ID she left at the scene. Concha identifies Le Tenia as Alex's rapist, setting up the events at the Rectum.

The last scenes of the film depict Alex, Marcus and Pierre earlier in the day where it's implied Alex left the more reserved Pierre for the uninhibited Marcus because he couldn't satisfy her sexually, which the former still holds frustration over. The film then reveals that Alex received a positive result on a pregnancy test she took at the start of the day. In the final scene, Alex is shown reading in a park before the film transitions to a strobe effect that ends with the message "Le Temps Detruit Tout", which is French for "Time Destroys Everything".

Cast

Director Gaspar Noé has a cameo as one of the patrons in the Rectum.

Production
Irréversible was originally titled as Danger.  Gaspar Noé first found financing for the new title after he pitched the story to be told in reverse, in order to capitalize on the popularity of Christopher Nolan's film Memento (2000).

Irréversible was shot using a widescreen lightweight Minima Super16 mm camera. The film consists of about a dozen apparently unbroken shots melded together from hundreds of shots. This included the infamous nine-minute-long rape scene, portrayed in a single, unbroken shot.  Noé said he had no idea how long the rape scene was going to last, as this was determined by Monica Bellucci, who essentially directed the scene, and Jo Prestia, who played her assailant. Noé stated in interviews that during the production of the film he used cocaine in order to help him carry the large cameras needed to capture the rotating shots in the film.

Computer-generated imagery was used in post-production for the penis in the rape scene. Another example is the scene where Pierre beats a man's face and crushes his skull with a fire extinguisher. CGI was used to augment the results, as initial footage using a conventional latex dummy proved unconvincing. During the first sixty minutes of its running time, the film uses an extremely low-frequency sound of 27Hz to create a state of nausea and anxiety in the audience, as it is not immediately perceptible to the spectator, but enough to evoke a physical response. This technique, called Sensurround, involves the intentional use of a sub-audible sound to enhance the spectator’s experience of a movie, in this case, deliberately making them uncomfortable (although this would only be experienced in a cinema setting as most home speakers would not emit such low frequencies).

Release

The film premiered in France on 22 May 2002 through Mars Distribution. It competed at the 2002 Cannes Film Festival. It was released in the United Kingdom on 31 January 2003 through Metro Tartan Distribution, and the United States on 7 March 2003 through Lions Gate Films.

Irréversible won the top award, the Bronze Horse for best film, at the 2002 Stockholm International Film Festival. It was nominated for the Best Foreign Language Award by the Film Critics Circle of Australia. It was voted Best Foreign Language Film by the San Diego Film Critics Society, tied with The Barbarian Invasions (Les Invasions barbares). It grossed $792,200 from theatrical screenings.

A version of the film told in chronological order, Irreversible: Straight Cut, screened at the 2019 Venice International Film Festival. It was released in Los Angeles and New York City on 10 February 2023.

Reception
Audience reactions to both the rape scene and the murder scene have ranged from appreciation of their artistic merits to leaving the theater in disgust. Newsweek's David Ansen stated that "If outraged viewers (mostly women) at the Cannes Film Festival are any indication, this will be the most walked-out-of movie of 2003." In the same review, Ansen suggested that the film displayed "an adolescent pride in its own ugliness".

Critical response to the film was divided, with some critics panning the film and others considering it one of the year's best. The film holds an approval rating of 58% based on 123 reviews at Rotten Tomatoes, with an average rating of 6.10/10. The website's critics' consensus states: "Though well-filmed, Irréversible feels gratuitous in its extreme violence." The American film critic Roger Ebert argued that the film's structure makes it inherently moral; that by presenting vengeance before the acts that inspire it, we are forced to process the vengeance first, and therefore think more deeply about its implications.

The film received three votes in the 2012 Sight & Sound critics' poll of the greatest films and in 2016 was listed by critic Andreas Borcholte as one of the ten best films since 2000.

Irréversible has been associated with a series of films defined as the cinéma du corps ("cinema of the body"), which according to Palmer includes: an attenuated use of narrative, assaulting and often illegible cinematography, confrontational subject material, and a pervasive sense of social nihilism or despair. Irréversible has also been associated with the New French Extremity movement.

Film critic David Edelstein argued "Irréversible might be the most homophobic movie ever made." Noé's depiction of gay criminal Le Tenia raping the female lead, Alex, remains the film's most controversial image. In his defense, Noé stated, "I'm not homophobic", noting "I also appear in Irréversible, masturbating at the gay club", as a means of showing "I didn't feel superior to gay people".

Curiosities 
During the making of Irréversible, low frequencies were used in a range from 22 to 36 Hz. These continuous oscillations (which can not be heard but physically “felt”) cause a sense of nausea, “motion sickness” or dizziness. Quoting Gaspar Noé, “You can’t hear them, but they make you shiver. In a good cinema with a good audio system, the sound can scare you much more than what’s happening on the screen.”

Awards 
Nominated for Palme d'Or, 2002

Won Bronze Horse, Stockholm Film Festival, 2002

Runner-up, Boston Society of Film Critics Awards, 2003; Best Cinematography, Best Foreign Language Film

Won Best Foreign Language Film, San Diego Film Critics Society Awards, 2003

Nominated for Best Foreign Language Film, Film Critics of Australia, 2004

References

Sources 

 Brinkema, Eugenie. (2004). Irréversible: A review. Scope.
 Brinkema, Eugenie. (2005). Rape and the Rectum: Bersani, Deleuze, Noé. Camera Obscura: Feminism, Culture, and Media Studies, 20(1), 32–57. https://doi.org/10.1215/02705346-20-1_58-33
 Downing, Lisa. (2004). French Cinema’s New ‘Sexual Revolution’: Postmodern Porn and Troubled Genre. French Cultural Studies, 15(3), 265–280. https://doi.org/10.1177/009715580401500305
 Grønstad, Asbjørn. (2011). On the Unwatchable. In T. Horeck & T. Kendall (Eds.), The New Extremism in Cinema: From France to Europe (pp. 192–205). Edinburgh University Press.
 Hickin, Daniel. (2011). Censorship, Reception and the Films of Gaspar Noé: The Emergence of New Extremism in Britain. In T. Horeck & T. Kendall (Eds.), The New Extremism in Cinema: From France to Europe (pp. 117–129). Edinburgh University Press.
 Keesey, Douglas. (2010). Split identification: Representations of rape in Gaspar Noé’s Irréversible and Catherine Breillat’s A ma sœur!/Fat Girl. Studies in European Cinema, 7(2), 95–107. https://doi.org/10.1386/seci.7.2.95_1
 Kenny, Oliver. (2020). Beyond Critical Partisanship: Ethical Witnessing and Long Takes of Sexual Violence. Studies in European Cinema, 19(2), 164–178. https://doi.org/10.1080/17411548.2020.1778846
 Wood, Robin. (2011, April 5). Against and For Irreversible. Film International. http://filmint.nu/?p=1475

External links
 
 
 
 
 Irreversible on Le Temps Détruit Tout (Unofficial & International website about Gaspar Noé)

2002 films
2002 crime drama films
2002 crime thriller films
2002 LGBT-related films
2000s mystery drama films
2000s psychological drama films
2002 psychological thriller films
2000s thriller drama films
2000s avant-garde and experimental films
2000s English-language films
Films about rape
Films about prostitution in France
Films about violence against women
Films directed by Gaspar Noé
Films set in Paris
Films shot in Paris
Improvised films
French crime drama films
French crime thriller films
French LGBT-related films
French avant-garde and experimental films
2000s French-language films
Homophobia in fiction
2000s Italian-language films
LGBT-related thriller drama films
French mystery drama films
2000s mystery thriller films
French nonlinear narrative films
Film controversies
Film controversies in France
LGBT-related controversies in film
Obscenity controversies in film
Incest in film
One-shot films
French rape and revenge films
2000s Spanish-language films
StudioCanal films
Transgender-related films
French psychological drama films
French psychological thriller films
French thriller drama films
Censored films
Films shot in 16 mm film
2002 multilingual films
French multilingual films
2000s French films